Comédie+ (formerly Comédie!) is a French cable network showing humorous programs since 1997. It bears some resemblance to Comedy Central; even the comédie word in the name is used in the very broad American meaning. It is directed by Dominique Farrugia, a former member of the Les Nuls comedy team. An often-shown program is La Grosse Emission which helped popularize the comedians troupe named Les Robins des Bois (The Robinhoods).

History
Comédie! began its broadcasts on 29 November 1997 on Canal Satellite and then on cable. The channel is dedicated to the actor and comedian Bruno Carette from the troupe Les Nuls, who died in 1989.

In 2003, the channel was bought by Pathé, which reformatted it to make it a mini-generalist of laughter and humor. As of September 20, 2003, its programs began at 8 a.m. Monday through Sunday. Following its withdrawal from television, Pathé sold the channel at the end of 2004 to multiThématiques, a subsidiary of Groupe Canal+.

The channel had been selected in 2005 to be among the pay-TV digital terrestrial television (TNT) channels shared with Cuisine TV, but its authorization was canceled shortly afterwards.

On 1 July 2015, Canalsat made a full transition to MPEG-4 and HD, Comédie+ switched to HD at this date.

On 1 July 2016, Comédie+, Infosport+, Planète+ and Planète+ A&E were removed of Numericable, because they lost their exclusivity exemption because of the launch of SFR fiber offers with Numericable TV bouquets. Since 19 March 2019, all Canal bouquets are available on SFR TV cable and fiber platform.

In August 2018, Canal+ launched a premium channel totally dedicated to humor for the African market (on Canal+ Afrique channel 5).

References

External links
 Official site

Television stations in France
Television channels and stations established in 1997
French-language television stations
Comedy television networks
MultiThématiques
1997 establishments in France